David L. Applegate is an American computer scientist known for his research on the traveling salesperson problem.

Education 
Applegate graduated from the University of Dayton in 1984, and completed his doctorate in 1991 from Carnegie Mellon University, with a dissertation on convex volume approximation supervised by Ravindran Kannan.

Career 
Applegate worked on the faculty at Rice University and at AT&T Labs before joining Google in New York City in 2016. His work on the Concorde TSP Solver, described in a 1998 paper, won the Beale–Orchard-Hays Prize of the Mathematical Optimization Society,
and his book The traveling salesman problem with the same authors won the Frederick W. Lanchester Prize in 2007.
He and Edith Cohen won the IEEE Communications Society's William R. Bennett Prize
for a 2006 research paper on robust network routing.
Another of his papers, on arithmetic without carrying, won the 2013 George Pólya Award.
In 2013, he was named an AT&T Fellow.

With Guy Jacobsen and Daniel Sleator, Applegate was the first to computerize the analysis of the pencil-and-paper game, Sprouts.

Selected publications

References

External links

Year of birth missing (living people)
Living people
American computer scientists
University of Dayton alumni
Carnegie Mellon University alumni
Rice University faculty